is a former Japanese football player.

Club career
Kawaguchi was born in Hokkaido on October 11, 1978. After graduating from high school, he joined Bellmare Hiratsuka (later Shonan Bellmare) in 1997. He played often in 1999. He moved to Tokyo Verdy in 2002. However he did not play much and moved to his local club, the Consadole Sapporo in 2003. He retired at the end of the 2003 season.

National team career
In August 1995, Kawaguchi was selected Japan U-17 national team for 1995 U-17 World Championship. He played full time in all 3 matches.

Club statistics

References

External links

Profile at consadeconsa.com

1978 births
Living people
Association football people from Hokkaido
Japanese footballers
Japan youth international footballers
J1 League players
J2 League players
Shonan Bellmare players
Tokyo Verdy players
Hokkaido Consadole Sapporo players
Association football defenders